Guyana has competed in sixteen editions of the Pan American Games, accruing eighteen medals.

Medal count

Summer

References

 
Pan American Games